Gary Magnée (born 12 October 1999) is a Belgian professional footballer who plays as a right-back for Eupen.

Career
Magnée played in the youth academies of Anderlecht, Genk and Club Brugge, before joining Eupen in 2018.

Magnée signed his first professional contract with Eupen on 13 June 2019. He then made his official debut for Eupen in the Belgian Cup on 25 September 2019, in the match against Cappellen where he played 120 minutes, including extra-time. Eupen eventually qualified for the next round by winning on a penalty-shootout.

Magnée made his league debut with Eupen in a 3–0 Belgian First Division A loss to Club Brugge on 26 December 2020. On 10 February 2021, Magnée scored his first professional goal, when manager Beñat San José had him in the starting lineup for the cup match against Olympic Charleroi. Eupen managed to win the match 5–1 and thus qualify for the quarter-finals, with a goal as well as 3 assists, Magnée played a large part in this.

References

External links
 
 Pro League Profile

1999 births
Living people
People from Soumagne
Belgian footballers
R.S.C. Anderlecht players
K.R.C. Genk players
Club Brugge KV players
K.A.S. Eupen players
Belgian Pro League players
Association football fullbacks
Footballers from Liège Province